Fulminating silver is a historic name which may apply to a number of silver based explosives which "fulminate" or detonate easily and violently. It has no exact chemical or dictionary definition, however it may refer to:

 silver fulminate (which, confusingly, is the only "fulminating silver" to be a silver compound with the fulminate anion)
 silver azide, AgN3
 a mixture, a decomposition product of Tollens' reagent
 silver nitride, Ag3N - one of the earliest silver based explosives 
 the alchemical substance "Argentum Fulminans"

The stability of many of these compounds can vary depending on how they are stored or handled, with levels of hydration often being a major factor.

References

Fulminates
Silver compounds